Havaianas (stylized as havaianas) is a Brazilian brand of flip-flop sandals created and patented in 1962. It is currently owned by Brazilian manufacturing company Alpargatas S.A. Inspired by Japanese zori sandals, Robert Fraser became the first to mass-produce flip-flops out of rubber. The name Havaianas is derived from the feminine form of the Portuguese word for "Hawaiians", and the pattern on the soles of the sandals is designed to resemble the straw soles of zori. Originally, all Havaianas featured white insoles with colored outsoles and straps. Because of their simplicity and low price, the sandals became rapidly popular with Brazil's lowest social classes. However, now their popularity is generalized and the brand controls 80% of the Brazilian rubber slippers market: in fact, of every three Brazilians, two on average consume a pair of "Havaianas" per year.

A fashion trend starting in the 1990s involved inverting the sole to make the coloured outsole face upwards, creating the appearance of a monochrome sandal. In response, Havaianas released a new line of eight one-colour sandals called Havaianas Top in 1994. Citizens of higher social classes then began to wear Havaianas. In 1998, with the impending FIFA World Cup in France, Havaianas introduced a line of flip-flops featuring a small Brazilian flag on the strap to show support of the Brazilian team. According to Havaianas's Twitter account, the brand "embodies Brazil's fun, vibrant & spontaneous way of life." Havaianas flip-flops are the most popular in the world, with 200 million pairs being sold every year. They are often found in surf wear retail and surf apparel stores.

Global expansion

Beginning 

In the 1960s, the flip-flop was a practical shoe worn by the working-class and was only made in a blue-and-white design. It became so associated with the poorer sector of society that it was listed as one of the fundamental goods by the Brazilian government, along with other household products. Traveling merchants sold them from the back of their vans. Variations in color and design are claimed to have all started serendipitously in 1969 when one batch of flip-flops came out to be green and suddenly gained popularity.

Marketing techniques 
Havaianas officially became a global brand in 2000, despite other brands imitating its style. To branch out to the global market, several marketing strategies were employed. Angela Hirata, the director of foreign trade for Alpargatas S.A. has explained that Havaianas was marketed to both the low-end market and the high-end market for all classes to purchase the shoe. The sandal can be purchased for US$6 to $40 in Brazil, but in the United States, the sandal can range at a more inflated price from US$11 to US$75.

The hallmark of Havaianas's success is innovation. Creative styles with various colors were manufactured in addition to closed-toed sandals for customers who live in cooler climates. Sandals with embellishments, like Swarovski crystals were also integrated in the new styles to be used for fashion shows and to be worn by models on runways. Another necessity was to invest greatly in sales and advertising of the shoes. Today, more advertising is seen online, but colorful print advertisements were utilized to attract consumers to Havaianas. Several rival brands have also served as a hindrance, such as Crocs, Rip Curl and Quicksilver. To combat these companies, Havaianas attracted new markets. The brand has also responded and remains flexible to changes in the market and consumers' preferences. For example, a drop in sales were noticed when Havaianas were being manufactured outside of Brazil and consequently, a decision was made to build another plant within Brazil. In total, the company has maintained popularity domestically and internationally with the aforementioned marketing strategies. Total revenue from Havaianas has been reported by Alpargatas S.A. to have increased from US$1.7bn in 2008 to US$2.6bn in 2011.

In 2017 it was announced that they would be sponsoring the Sahara Force India Formula One team.

Brand identity and extension 

Brand identity also contributes to Havaianas's global outreach. The company has leveraged Brazil's positive identity to build a successful brand. As a result, advertisements for Havaianas and the shoes themselves are colorful and simple. The product's most well-known slogan is "The Legitimate Ones" since, due to its success, many other companies have launched similar products to compete with Havaianas. Entire shops devoted to the brand exist internationally and the shoes are sold in over 80 countries, including those who experience varying climates. Brand extension has been utilized as an effective way to mitigate this seasonality. The brand has extended to include towels, sunglasses, and espadrilles. In most recent years, several ranges have been launched, such as a flat range, a sunglasses range, and a clothing collection. The usage of these techniques has reached people from all classes and from different areas across the globe. Millions of people wear Havaianas, whether it be in the form of flip-flops, apparel, or accessories.

The present 
The brand is highly successful and Havaianas are worn by customers around the world. However, Alpargatas S.A., Havaianas's manufacturing company, was previously owned by J&F Investments. Alleged discussions of bribery took place and has hurt J&F Investments economically. As of July 2017, Alpargatas is owned by three Brazilian companies, Itaúsa, Cambuhy Investimentos and Brasil Warrant.

References

External links

 

Shoe brands
Brazilian brands
Clothing companies of Brazil
Clothing companies established in 1962
Eyewear brands of Brazil
1962 establishments in Brazil